The Chalk Bluffs is a barren chalk escarpment in the northeastern part of the U.S. state of Colorado, stretching from the Wyoming border east of I-25 to near the South Platte River in Logan County and Weld County.

Geology
The Chalk Bluffs exposes the Ogallala, Fox Hills and Arikaree Formations. Miocene, Eocene and Paleocene vertebrate fossils are found.

Ecology
Most of the escarpment lies within the Pawnee National Grasslands.

As the bluffs are primarily barren and protected from fire. However trees normally found in the foothills of the Rocky Mountains are found there, including: Ponderosa pine, Rocky Mountain juniper, limber pine, and mountain mahogany. 

Numerous raptors nest on the cliffs including Swainson's hawks, ferruginous hawks, golden eagles, and prairie falcons. The bluffs are a favorite site for birdwatching. It has been recognized by the National Audubon Society as a site of "global importance".

Chalk Bluffs Natural Area
A  portion of the Chalk Bluffs in Weld County were set aside in September 2001 by the Colorado State Parks Natural Areas Program as the Chalk Bluffs Natural Area.

Wind farm
The bluffs are adjacent to the Cedar Creek Wind Farm.

References

Escarpments of the United States
Chalk
Landforms of Colorado
Nature reserves in Colorado
Landforms of Weld County, Colorado
Landforms of Logan County, Colorado
Protected areas of Logan County, Colorado
Protected areas of Weld County, Colorado
Neogene Colorado
Paleogene Colorado
Miocene United States
Eocene North America
Paleocene North America
Eocene paleontological sites of North America
Miocene paleontological sites of North America
Protected areas established in 2001
2001 establishments in Colorado